Radhika Chaudhari is an Indian actress, who has worked in Hindi, Tamil and Telugu film industries, predominantly in the early 2000s. In 2010, she made a comeback as a film director in the US, winning an award at the Las Vegas Film Festival.

Career
In 2010, she made a comeback of sorts as a director based in Los Angeles, and won the Silver Ace Award for Best Short Film at the Las Vegas Film Festival, for her critically acclaimed short film Orange Blossom. The film was shot in Los Angeles in a span of four days and the 17-minute film told the story of a single mother going through the pangs of separation from her husband; while making the folly of passing on too much information about herself and her family to a few strangers. Usha Kokotay played the protagonist, while others in the cast included Jeff Doucette and John Paul Ouvrier.

Filmography

Television

References

External links
Official website

Living people
Indian film actresses
Actresses in Hindi cinema
Actresses in Tamil cinema
Actresses in Telugu cinema
Actresses in Kannada cinema
Indian expatriate actresses in the United States
20th-century Indian actresses
21st-century Indian actresses
Year of birth missing (living people)